Hondelage is a Stadtbezirk (borough) on the river Schunter in the north-eastern part of Braunschweig, Germany.

History

The village of Hondelage was first mentioned in documents in 1179. During the early 16th century, the farming village became property of the Imperial abbey Riddagshausen. In 1974, Hondelage, until then part of the disbanded rural district of Braunschweig, was incorporated into the city of Braunschweig and became a city district.

Numerous fossils have been found in the Posidonia Shale of Hondelage, including Ichthyosaurus and Steneosaurus. Hondelagia, an extinct genus of snakefly, is named after Hondelage, the only place it has been found so far.

Politics
The district mayor Jörg Gille is a member of the Social Democratic Party of Germany.

References

External links

Website 
History of Hondelage 

Boroughs and quarters of Braunschweig
Former municipalities in Lower Saxony